Břetislav Putna (born 30 April 1959) is a Czech sports shooter. He competed in the men's 25 metre rapid fire pistol event at the 1988 Summer Olympics.

References

1959 births
Living people
Czech male sport shooters
Olympic shooters of Czechoslovakia
Shooters at the 1988 Summer Olympics
Sportspeople from Brno